Paul Michael Maddy (born 17 August 1962) is a Welsh retired professional footballer who played in Football League, most notably for Hereford United as a midfielder. He also played League football for Cardiff City, Brentford, Chester City and was capped by Wales at U21 level.

Club career 
A midfielder, Maddy was a product of the Cardiff City youth system and made 43 appearances and scored three goals for the club. Interspersed with spells at Swansea City, Brentford and Chester City, Maddy spent the majority of his Football League career with Fourth Division club Hereford United, for whom he made 151 appearances and scored 22 goals in three spells between 1983 and 1989. He later played in Malta for Hamrun Spartans and the League of Wales for Ebbw Vale.

International career 
Maddy was capped twice by Wales at U21 level, in matches against Netherlands and Norway in 1982 and 1983.

Personal life 
As of October 2017, Maddy was working in a factory in South Wales.

Honours 
Hereford United
 Herefordshire Senior Cup: 1984–85

Career statistics

References

1962 births
Living people
Welsh footballers
English Football League players
Association football midfielders
Wales under-21 international footballers
Cardiff City F.C. players
Hereford United F.C. players
Swansea City A.F.C. players
Brentford F.C. players
Chester City F.C. players
Ħamrun Spartans F.C. players
Welsh expatriate footballers
Welsh expatriate sportspeople in Malta
Expatriate footballers in Malta
Maltese Premier League players
Ebbw Vale F.C. players
Welsh expatriate sportspeople in Australia
Expatriate soccer players in Australia